Everybody Loves Somebody is a 2017 Mexican romantic comedy film written and directed by Catalina Aguilar Mastretta, and starring Karla Souza and José María Yazpik.

Plot

A successful and single physician officially provides obstetrics and gynaecology service but also gives couples advice on happiness. The twist is that she has not enjoyed success in her own romantic life. She travels between her job in the United States and her immediate family's location in Mexico. She asks her co-worker to pose as her boyfriend at a family wedding back  in Mexico. When her ex beau shows up, comedy mayhem takes place.

Cast
Karla Souza as Clara
José María Yazpik as Daniel
Ben O'Toole as Asher
Alejandro Camacho as Francisco
Patricia Bernal as Eva
Tiaré Scanda as Abby
Ximena Romo as Lily Álvarez

Reception
The film received positive reviews and has a 93% rating on Rotten Tomatoes.

References

External links
 
 

2017 films
2017 romantic comedy films
2010s Spanish-language films
Mexican romantic comedy films
Films about Mexican Americans
Films set in Los Angeles
Films set in Mexico
2010s English-language films
2017 multilingual films
Mexican multilingual films
2010s Mexican films